Bangladesh Government Press is the official printing house of Bangladesh government. It is also known as BG press. The press is responsible for publishing government documents including classified documents. It publishes budgets, parliament bills, resolutions, ordinances, and posters. They are responsible for printing court verdicts and legal cases.

History
Bangladesh Government Press traces its origins to the East Bengal Government Press which was based in Kolkata. It was briefly shifted to Dhaka Central Jail. It was reorganized and moved to current location in 1953; it was renamed East Pakistan Government Press. After the Independence of Bangladesh, East Pakistan Government Press became the Bangladesh Government Press.

In 2012, taka 11 crore were embezzled by people using fake cheques similar to the ones printed by BG press. In December 2014, bdnews24.com reported that security at the Printing press was inadequate. There had been some concerns over security after questions for national examinations, including Bangladesh Civil Service exams, were leaked. In June 2016, an employee of the press memorized questions papers for H.S.C. examinations and tried to sell them. He was arrested along with 9 others.

References

1971 establishments in Bangladesh
Organisations based in Dhaka
Government agencies of Bangladesh
Government-owned companies of Bangladesh